Seget may refer to:

 Seget, Croatia, a municipality in Split-Dalmatia County, Croatia
 Seget (Umag), a village in Istria County, Croatia
 Seget, Indonesia, a district in Sorong Regency, West Papua
 Seget language, a language of West Papua, Indonesia
 Thomas Seget (1569–1627), Scottish poet

See also 
 Szeged, a city in Hungary